Heini Stocker (born 26 August 1973) is a retired Liechtenstein football defender.

References

1973 births
Living people
Liechtenstein footballers
FC Balzers players
Association football defenders
Liechtenstein international footballers